Carl Warren Selin (February 23, 1927 – February 23, 2014) was an American football basketball, and baseball coach. He served as the head football coach at Aurora University from 1950 to 1951 and at the University of California, Riverside from 1956 to 1958.  Selin was also the head basketball coach at Aurora from 1951 to 1953, where he compiled a record of 4–35.  In addition, Selin was the head baseball coach at Aurora from 1952 to 1953, posting a record of 5–24–1.

Selin was the head baseball coach at the United States Coast Guard Academy for five years in the early 1960s, where he also served as the athletic director from 1966 until his retirement in 1979.

Head coaching record

Football

References

1927 births
2014 deaths
Aurora Spartans baseball coaches
Aurora Spartans football coaches
Aurora Spartans men's basketball coaches
Basketball coaches from California
Coast Guard Bears athletic directors
Coast Guard Bears baseball coaches
Coast Guard Bears football coaches
Northern Illinois Huskies football players
UC Riverside Highlanders football coaches
Sportspeople from Berkeley, California